Jane Admans (born 21 June 1959) is a female retired British swimmer. Admans competed in the women's 200 metre backstroke at the 1980 Summer Olympics. At the ASA National British Championships she won the 200 metres backstroke title twice (1979 and 1980).

References

External links
 

1959 births
Living people
British female swimmers
Olympic swimmers of Great Britain
Swimmers at the 1980 Summer Olympics
People from Eton, Berkshire
20th-century British women